Tom Pettitt ( - ) was the real tennis world champion from 1885 to 1890.

Biography
Born in Beckenham, Kent, England, Pettitt emigrated to Boston, Massachusetts, United States, as a penniless teenager.  He quickly rose from being the dressing-room boy at a private court on Buckingham Street, to being its head professional at age seventeen.  He began playing matches in Great Britain and France to improve his game, and finally challenged George Lambert at the Royal Tennis Court, Hampton Court Palace, for the world championship in 1885.  He defended his title in Dublin in 1890, then retired the title the same year.  He is credited with inventing the railroad, a fast overarm service that runs the length of the penthouse with a reverse twist.

Pettitt continued to work in Boston at various clubs, retiring from the Tennis and Racquet Club in 1927 after half a century of service.  He also taught lawn tennis at the Newport Casino during the summers from 1876–1929, and afterwards continued as a supervisor there.

Pettitt died in Newport, Rhode Island.  He was inducted into the International Tennis Hall of Fame in 1982.

See also
 List of real tennis world champions

References

External links
 
 1890 World Championship match

1859 births
1946 deaths
19th-century American people
American real tennis players
English emigrants to the United States
People from Beckenham
Tennis players from Boston
Sportspeople from Newport, Rhode Island
International Tennis Hall of Fame inductees